Belleville-en-Beaujolais (literally Belleville in Beaujolais) is a commune of the Rhône department in eastern France. It was established on 1 January 2019 by merger of the former communes of Belleville (the seat) and Saint-Jean-d'Ardières.

Population

See also
Communes of the Rhône department

References

Communes of Rhône (department)
Beaujolais (province)